Evelina Asenova Tsvetanova (born ) is a Bulgarian female former volleyball player, playing as a setter. She was part of the Bulgaria women's national volleyball team.

She competed at the 2009 Women's European Volleyball Championship. On club level she played for Anorthosis Famagosta in 2009.

References

External links
http://www.cev.lu/competition-area/PlayerDetails.aspx?TeamID=5157&PlayerID=5342&ID=366
http://bgvolleyball.com/en/player.php?id=11
http://www.ziolo.eu/photos/evelina-tsvetanova-vc-rabbita-baku/18730

1974 births
Living people
Bulgarian women's volleyball players
Place of birth missing (living people)
Setters (volleyball)